Denis is a French surname. Notable people with the surname include:

Denis (harpsichord makers) an influential family of Parisian harpsichord makers in the 16th and 17th centuries
Armand Denis (1896–1971), Belgian-born wildlife film-maker
Azellus Denis (1907–1991), Canadian politician
Claire Denis (born 1946), French film director
Francisco Denis, Venezuelan actor and director
Germán Denis (born 1981), Argentine footballer
Harry Dénis (1896–1971), Dutch football player
Jean Denis (1902–1992), Belgian politician and writer
Jonathan Denis (born 1976), Canadian politician
Joseph Denis (1657–1736), Canadian priest
Lara Denis (born 1969), American philosopher 
Léon Denis (1846–1927), French spiritist and philosopher
Marc Denis (born 1977), Canadian former ice hockey player
Marilyn Denis (born 1958), Canadian broadcaster
Maurice Denis (1870–1943), French painter
Michael Denis (1729–1800), Austrian poet and entomologist
Michaela Denis (1914–2003), wildlife documentary film-maker and presenter
Mo Denis (born 1961), American politician
Neil Denis (born 1987), Canadian actor
Óscar Denis (born 1946), Paraguayan politician, Vice President (2012–2013)
Sir Peter Denis, 1st Baronet (1713–1778), English officer and Member of Parliament
Sergio Denis (born 1949), Argentine singer
Willey Glover Denis (1879–1929), American biochemist and physiologist